Emilie R. Feldman (c. 1982) is an American business theorist.
Feldman graduated from Harvard College and Harvard Business School, and subsequently joined the Wharton School of the University of Pennsylvania in 2010, where she is the Michael L. Tarnopol Professor of Management.

References

American business theorists
1980s births
Living people
Year of birth uncertain
American women academics

University of Pennsylvania faculty
Harvard College alumni
Harvard Business School alumni